Mohammad Asafuddowlah is a Bangladeshi lyricist, composer, orator and a former secretary of the Water Development Board of the Government of Bangladesh. He served as the founding editor of the English daily The Bangladesh Today. He was awarded the Ekushey Padak in 1993 by the Government of Bangladesh for his contribution to music.

Background
Asafuddowla studied at the Faridpur Zilla School.

Works
Albums
 Sur-e Sur-e Dekha Hobey (lyrics and composition; 2011)

References

Living people
Year of birth missing (living people)
Bangladeshi male musicians
Recipients of the Ekushey Padak
Place of birth missing (living people)